Warner Township is a civil township of Antrim County in the U.S. state of Michigan. The population was 416 at the 2010 census.

Geography

Demographics
As of the census of 2000, there were 389 people, 133 households, and 107 families residing in the township.  The population density was 11.0 per square mile (4.2/km).  There were 185 housing units at an average density of 5.2 per square mile (2.0/km).  The racial makeup of the township was 94.60% White, 0.26% African American, 1.29% Native American, and 3.86% from two or more races. Hispanic or Latino of any race were 0.77% of the population.

There were 133 households, out of which 42.9% had children under the age of 18 living with them, 66.2% were married couples living together, 9.8% had a female householder with no husband present, and 19.5% were non-families. 14.3% of all households were made up of individuals, and 6.0% had someone living alone who was 65 years of age or older.  The average household size was 2.92 and the average family size was 3.20.

In the township the population was spread out, with 27.8% under the age of 18, 8.2% from 18 to 24, 32.4% from 25 to 44, 20.8% from 45 to 64, and 10.8% who were 65 years of age or older.  The median age was 36 years. For every 100 females, there were 116.1 males.  For every 100 females age 18 and over, there were 105.1 males.

The median income for a household in the township was $35,357, and the median income for a family was $42,188. Males had a median income of $27,727 versus $22,188 for females. The per capita income for the township was $14,948.  About 2.1% of families and 8.6% of the population were below the poverty line, including 5.3% of those under age 18 and 9.3% of those age 65 or over.

References

Townships in Antrim County, Michigan
Townships in Michigan